99%: The Occupy Wall Street Collaborative Film is a 2013 documentary film about the Occupy Wall Street movement directed by  Audrey Ewell, Aaron Aites, Lucian Read, Nina Krstic, and co-directed by Katie Teague, Peter Leeman, Aric Gutnick, Doree Simon, and Abby Martin.  The project features the work of more than 100 collaborators who contributed approximately 18 terabytes of film footage from dozens of American cities.  Commentators include Naomi Wolf, Matt Taibbi, and Micah White.

References

Further reading
Bryge, Duane. (February 1, 2013). 99%: The Occupy Wall Street Collaborative Film: Sundance Review. Hollywood Reporter. 
Hill, Logan. (January 13, 2013).  The Messy Work of Examining Disorganizations. The New York Times, 162(56015): AR14.
Li, Sherrie. (September 11, 2013). From Zuccotti to UC Davis: 99%--The Occupy Wall Street Collaborative Film. The Village Voice.
Webster, Andy. (September 6, 2013). The Protest in the Park. The New York Times, 162(56251): C15.

External links
Official site
 

2013 films
2013 documentary films
American documentary films
Documentary films about American politics
Occupy Wall Street
Citizen mass media in the United States
Documentary films about New York City
2010s English-language films
2010s American films